Chapaev (Chapaev; Russian: Чапаев) is a town in north-western Kazakhstan. It is the seat of Akzhaik District in West Kazakhstan Region. Population:  

The town is located 130 km south of Oral, Kazakhstan (Uralsk), on the right bank of the Ural River.

The town was the place of death of Vasily Chapayev, the Red Army commander of the Russian Civil War (1919). A museum was established in his memory in 1927.

The earlier settlement was named Lbishchensk and in 1899 the town had 3400 people (2100 of which were Cossacks), 2 churches, 2 schools, and mail and telegraph connections. It has been renamed to Chapaevo in 1939, and Chapaev in 1992.

The local residents are mainly engaged in agriculture, fishing, herding, hunting and gathering liquorice root.

In 1997 the town became the capital of Akzhaik District.

References

Populated places in West Kazakhstan Region
Ural Oblast (Russian Empire)